Roy Christopher Hergenroeder (December 27, 1935 - February 2, 2021) was an American art director and production designer.

Early life 
Christopher was born in Fresno, California as Roy Christopher Hergenroeder. He was a son of a farmer. Christopher received his bachelor's degree and graduated at California State University, in 1957.

Career 
Christopher began his career in 1970, as art directing on the television series The Name of the Game.

Later in his career, Christopher would art direct and production design the Grammy Awards, Academy Awards and Primetime Emmy Awards specials. In 1976, he was nominated for an Primetime Emmy for Outstanding Achievement in Art Direction or Scenic Design - Dramatic Special or Feature Length Film Made for TV, which he shared with set decorator Frank Lombardo for his art directing work on the television special The Legendary Curse of the Hope Diamond.

In 1980s-2000s, Christopher worked on a Broadway theatre in 1984, he scenic designed the play A Woman of Independent Means. He also worked on television programs including, Growing Pains, Murphy Brown, Wings, Frasier, NewsRadio, Just Shoot Me! and Becker. In addition to his work, he received numerous Primetime Emmy nominations and wins from 1976 to 2008, as it includes, Outstanding Art Direction and Outstanding Individual Achievement. He also received some Art Directors Guild Awards from 1997 to 2009.

In 2017, Christopher was honored in the Television Hall of Fame.

Death 
Christopher died at his home in West Hollywood, California, in his sleep, at the age of 85.

References

External links 

 Rotten Tomatoes profile
 Television Academy profile

1935 births
2021 deaths
American art directors
American production designers
People from Fresno, California
Primetime Emmy Award winners
California State University, Fresno alumni